"27" is a song by Scottish band Biffy Clyro from their 2002 debut album, Blackened Sky. It was the band's first single on Beggars Banquet, released on 9 April 2001 in the United Kingdom. Although the song did not reach the top 100 on the UK Singles Chart, it managed to peak at number 43 on the UK Indie Chart.

Overview
"27" was voted Single of the Week by US band Taproot in the 7 April 2001 issue of Kerrang! magazine. Bassist James Johnston has commented about this, saying:

Track listings
Songs and lyrics by Simon Neil. Music by Biffy Clyro.
CD BBQCD352, 7" BBQ352
"27" – 3:27
"Instructio4" – 5:53
"Breatheher" – 3:54

Personnel
 Simon Neil – guitar, vocals
 James Johnston – bass, vocals
 Ben Johnston – drums, vocals
 Chris Sheldon – producer

Charts

References

External links
"27" Lyrics
"27" Guitar Tablature
"27" Review on Drowned in Sound

Biffy Clyro songs
Songs written by Simon Neil
Song recordings produced by Chris Sheldon
2002 songs
Beggars Banquet Records singles
2002 singles